Kim Chol-ryong (born 18 August 1972) is a North Korean alpine skier. He competed in the men's giant slalom at the 1992 Winter Olympics.

References

External links
 

1972 births
Living people
North Korean male alpine skiers
Olympic alpine skiers of North Korea
Alpine skiers at the 1992 Winter Olympics
Place of birth missing (living people)